In the early hours of February 4, 1999, an unarmed 23-year-old Guinean student named Amadou Diallo (born September 2, 1975) was fired upon with 41 rounds and shot a total of 19 times by four New York City Police Department plainclothes officers: Sean Carroll, Richard Murphy, Edward McMellon, and Kenneth Boss. Carroll later claimed to have mistaken him for a rape suspect from one year earlier.

The four officers, who were part of the now-defunct Street Crime Unit, were charged with second-degree murder and acquitted at trial in Albany, New York. A firestorm of controversy erupted after the event, as the circumstances of the shooting prompted outrage both inside and outside of New York City. Issues such as police brutality, racial profiling, and contagious shooting were central to the ensuing controversy.

Early life 
Amadou Diallo was one of four children born to Saikou and Kadiatou Diallo, and part of a historic Fulbe trading family in Guinea. He was born in Sinoe County in Liberia on September 2, 1975, while his father was working there, and while growing up followed his family to Togo, Singapore, Thailand, and back to Guinea. In September 1996, he followed other family members to New York City and started a business with a cousin. According to his family's lawyer he sought to remain in the United States by filing a political asylum application falsely claiming that he was from Mauritania and that his parents had been killed in fighting. He sold video cassettes, gloves, and socks on the sidewalk along 14th Street during the day.

Death 
In the early morning of February 4, 1999, Diallo was standing near his building after returning from a meal. At about 12:40 a.m., officers Edward McMellon, Sean Carroll, Kenneth Boss and Richard Murphy were looking for a serial rapist in the Soundview section of the Bronx. While driving down Wheeler Avenue, the police officers observed Diallo standing in front of his building entrance looking up and down the street. They stopped their unmarked car intending to question Diallo. When they ordered Diallo to show his hands, he ran up into the building entrance and reached into his pocket to produce what turned out to be his wallet. Assuming Diallo was drawing a firearm, the four officers fired 41 shots with semi-automatic pistols, hitting Diallo 19 times, fatally wounding him. Eyewitness Sherrie Elliott stated that the police continued to shoot even though Diallo was already down.

The investigation found no weapons on or near Diallo; what he had pulled out of his jacket was a wallet. The internal NYPD investigation ruled that the officers had acted within policy, based on what a reasonable police officer would have done in the same circumstances. Nonetheless, the Diallo shooting led to a review of police training policy and of the use of full metal jacket (FMJ) bullets.

On March 25, 1999, a Bronx grand jury indicted the four officers on charges of second-degree murder and reckless endangerment. On December 16, a court ordered a change of venue to Albany, New York because of pretrial publicity. On February 25, 2000, after three days of deliberation, a jury composed of four black and eight white jurors acquitted the officers of all charges.

Aftermath 

In April 2000, Diallo's mother and father filed a $61million lawsuit against the city and the officers, charging gross negligence, wrongful death, racial profiling, and other violations of Diallo's civil rights. In March 2004, they accepted a $3 million settlement, one of the largest in the City of New York for a single man with no dependents under New York State's "wrongful death law", which limits damages to financial loss by the deceased person's next of kin. Anthony H. Gair, representing the Diallo family, argued that federal common law should apply.

In April 2002, as a result of the killing of Diallo and other controversial actions, the Street Crime Unit was disbanded. In 2003, Diallo's mother published a memoir, My Heart Will Cross This Ocean: My Story, My Son, Amadou, with the help of author Craig Wolff.

Diallo's death became an issue in the 2005 New York City mayoral election. Bronx borough president and mayoral candidate Fernando Ferrer, who had protested against the circumstances of the killing at the time, was criticized by the Diallo family and many others for telling a meeting of police sergeants that although the shooting had been a tragedy, the officers had been "over-indicted".

Officer Kenneth Boss had previously been involved in an incident in which an unarmed black man was shot. After the trial Boss was reassigned to desk duty, but in October 2012, Commissioner Raymond W. Kelly restored Boss's ability to carry a firearm. As of 2012, he was the only one of the four officers still working for the NYPD. In 2015, he was promoted to sergeant in accordance with state civil service law, which is not subject to review by top department officials. The next year, he was named "sergeant of the year" by his union. He retired from law enforcement in 2019.

A report from Capital New York reported that 85 IP addresses belonging to the New York Police Department had made changes to Wikipedia pages about NYPD misconduct and also to articles about people killed in police interventions, including this article. One of these edits changed the statement "Officer Kenneth Boss had previously been involved in an incident in which an unarmed man was shot, but continued to work as a police officer" to "Officer Kenneth Boss was previously involved in an incident in which a man armed was shot.” Two policemen associated with these edits were reported to receive only "minor reprimands".

In April 2021, Diallo's mother was interviewed about her reaction to the conviction of Minneapolis police officer Derek Chauvin for the murder of George Floyd.

Cultural references to Diallo

Music 
The song "I Know You Don't Care" by Ziggy Marley, Bunny Wailer, Buju Banton, Damian "Junior Gong" Marley, Morgan Heritage & Yami Bolo (2001) is in direct response to the acquittal of the officers accused of murdering Diallo. In the chorus Ziggy Marley sings, "Code of silence you say, yes your actions speak so loud and clear, Diallo's killers going free, Paid by society, And I know you don't care about me."  
Bruce Springsteen's song "American Skin (41 Shots)"
"Diallo" by Wyclef Jean;
"New York City Cops" off The Strokes' debut album Is This It had the incident as the inspiration. Singer Julian Casablancas revealed that this was a political song influenced by the shooting of Amadou Diallo in a March 2018 Vulture interview.
"I Find It Hard to Say (Rebel)" by Lauryn Hill;
"Lament for the Late AD" by Terry Callier.
The Public Enemy album There's a Poison Goin' On has a song titled "41:19" based on the number of rounds fired at and striking Diallo and contains lyrics concerning police harassment and violence.
Electro pop band Le Tigre lamented the Diallo shooting in their song "Bang! Bang!", which ends with a vocal chorus counting numbers that ends with 41, the number of shots fired.
The piece "Amadou Diallo", included in the album Ethnic Stew and Brew by jazz trumpeter Roy Campbell, Jr., was inspired by the shooting, ending with a rapid burst of notes replicating the 41 gunshots.
The incident also served as the basis for Erykah Badu's track  "A.D. 2000" (the abbreviation standing for Diallo's initials), from the album Mama's Gun. Rather than singing a condemnation of the NYPD, as had most other artists who were incensed by the event, Badu chose to sing an elegy which, while noting the tragedy of Diallo's killing, also observes the furor over the circumstances, which she viewed as likely to be temporary: "No you won't be namin' no buildings after me/To go down dilapidated ooh/No you won't be namin' no buildings after me/My name will be misstated, surely".
In his album The Beautiful Struggle, Talib Kweli  speaks of "Brother Amadou as [...] a modern day martyr." Kweli makes further reference to the shooting in his song "The Proud": "It's in they job description to terminate the threat/So 41 shots to the body is what he can expect".
The phrase "Mom, I'm going to college" is attributed as Amadou Diallo's last words, featured in the third movement of Joel Thompson's seven-movement cantata Seven Last Words of the Unarmed.
The song "DPA (As Seen On T.V.)" by Company Flow, El-P,(2000) makes a direct reference to Diallo and to the acquittal of the officers accused of his senseless murder. In the lyrics, El-P raps “…or rock that polo vest with forty one magnets / and see if it metastasize when cornered by dragnet” .

Film 
In 2000, a group of human rights organizations completed The Day After Diallo, a short video about police violence against people of color in the context of the killing of Amadou Diallo. The video was co-produced by WITNESS, New York City PoliceWatch and The Ella Baker Center for Human Rights.

Visual arts 
A drawing by Art Spiegelman showing a police officer at a shooting gallery with a banner reading "41 shots 10¢" was featured on the cover of The New Yorker on March 8, 1999. 250 police officers picketed the magazine's headquarters in response.

Poetry 

 The poem "Marionette" by poet Ross Gay is dedicated to Diallo and describes his shooting.

See also 

 American Skin (41 Shots)
 Blink: The Power of Thinking Without Thinking
 Civil rights
 Killing of Jayland Walker
 List of killings by law enforcement officers in the United States
 New York City Police Department corruption and misconduct
 Police brutality
 Police brutality in the United States
 Racial profiling

References

External links 
Amadou Diallo Foundation
"The Day After Diallo" (short film)

New York City Police Department corruption and misconduct
Deaths by firearm in the Bronx
Deaths by person in New York City
1999 in New York City
Crimes in the Bronx
History of the Bronx
Police brutality in the United States
February 1999 events in the United States
Soundview, Bronx
1990s in the Bronx
Black Lives Matter
Law enforcement controversies in the United States